Liah O'Prey (born 15 December 1999) is a Spanish-born Irish-French actress. She began her career as a child actress and speaks English, French, Spanish and Catalan.

Early life
O'Prey was born in Barcelona to an Irish father and a Corsican mother from Pietralba. After completing high school, she enrolled at a drama school Paris.

Career
At the age of 11, O'Prey made her feature film debut in Juan Carlos Medina's 2012 multilingual horror Painless as Inès. She played Anna in the 2014 Irish-South African science fiction film Young Ones. In 2015, O'Prey appeared in two French television films: My Son as Héloïse and Eyes Open as Clara. The following year, she starred as Laetitia in West Coast. She played a younger version of Laia Costa's character in Black Snow (2017).

O'Prey played Mary Livingston in the 2018 historical drama Mary Queen of Scots and Virginie in the 2020 Netflix film Madame Claude. She then landed the recurring roles of Tatiana in the French series Mortel and Beatrice, an Irish exchange student, in Damien Chazelle's miniseries The Eddy, both on Netflix.

In 2021, O'Prey starred as Julia the Elder in the Sky Atlantic and Italia historical series Domina and made a guest appearance as the titular character in the Capitaine Marleau episode "Claire obscure". In September 2021, it was announced O'Prey had joined the main cast of the upcoming BBC and Canal+ series Marie Antoinette.

Filmography

Film

Television

References

External links

Living people
1999 births
Actresses from Barcelona
French people of Irish descent
Irish people of French descent
Spanish people of French descent
Spanish people of Irish descent
People of Corsican descent